The following list of Portuguese general officers (Peninsular War) lists the generals who served in the Portuguese forces in Spain and Portugal during the Peninsular War (1808–1814). The rank given refers to the ones held until the end of the war, in 1814. The list includes foreign nationals who fought in Portuguese military units.

It includes members of the Portuguese Legion (Legião Portuguesa), created by Napoleon in November 1807 and mobilized by Junot on occupying Portugal in 1807, as well as those that would later be incorporated into the Anglo-Portuguese Army, under Wellington, created on 22 April 1809.

Overview
Napoleon had intended the campaign on the Peninsula to be a walkover, but what he would come to call the Spanish Ulcer, ended up with him having had to send in thirteen of his maréchals (ten of whom were of the first promotion – of fourteen), and enter Madrid himself. Apart from the original 28,000 troops that had entered Spain under Junot, heading for Portugal, he would have to send in a further two hundred and seventy thousand men — more than half of the empire's total military strength.

List

See also
Chronology of events of the Peninsular War
List of British general officers (Peninsular War)
List of French general officers (Peninsular War)
List of Spanish general officers (Peninsular War)

References

Portuguese generals
General officers
Portuguese